Jaume Morera i Galícia (1854 – 24 April 1927) was a Catalan landscape painter.

Biography 
He was born in Lleida. His family was from a small town and had been attracted to Lleida by business opportunities. He moved to Madrid to study landscape painting at the Real Academia de Bellas Artes de San Fernando under Carlos de Haes. In 1874, he was chosen to be one of the first students at the newly founded "Academia de España en Roma", together with Francisco Pradilla, Casto Plasencia and Alejandro Ferrant. While there, he produced many paintings of the Italian countryside in the Academic style.

Upon his return to Spain in 1877, he stayed only briefly in Lleida, then established himself in Madrid. Nevertheless, he maintained a lifetime connection to his native city. From his base in Madrid, he travelled widely, often accompanied by Haes, visiting the Netherlands, Belgium and France. From these places, he produced works that he displayed at the annual National Exhibition of Fine Arts, winning several medals.
In 1900, he married María Felisa Alday, who had been Carlos de Haes' caretaker during the latter's final days. The couple took up residence on a farm near a small village between Madrid and the Basque Country. 

In 1915, he returned to his hometown to help establish the "Museu d'Art Modern de Lleida", a large portion of which was devoted to the works of Haes that had been left to him in Haes' will. Eventually, his contributions to the museum were considered so significant that it was renamed the Museu d'Art Jaume Morera in 1924.

He was attracted to Nordic-style landscapes and spent much of his time painting in the Sierra de Guadarrama. He also painted along the coast of Northern Spain near Algorta. He died in Madrid.

His brother was the politician and poet .

References

Further reading
 Jaume Morera, En la Sierra Del Guadarrama. Divagaciones ... Cuadros, Estudios, Dibujos, 1927.
 Enrique Arias Anglés and Jesús Navarro Guitart, Jaime Morera y Galicia (1854-1927), Zaragoza, Museo e Instituto Camón Aznar, 1999.

External links 

 Museu d'Art Jaume Morera homepage.
 ArtNet: More paintings by Morera

1854 births
1927 deaths
19th-century Spanish painters
19th-century Spanish male artists
Spanish male painters
Painters from Catalonia
Landscape painters
20th-century Spanish painters
20th-century Spanish male artists
Real Academia de Bellas Artes de San Fernando alumni